Ugochi Opara  (born 27 May 1976) is a Nigerian footballer who played as a goalkeeper for the Nigeria women's national football team. She was part of the team at the 1995 FIFA Women's World Cup and 2003 FIFA Women's World Cup.

References

External links
 

1976 births
Living people
Nigerian women's footballers
Nigeria women's international footballers
Place of birth missing (living people)
1995 FIFA Women's World Cup players
2003 FIFA Women's World Cup players
Women's association football goalkeepers